Scythris distactica is a moth of the family Scythrididae. It was described by Edward Meyrick in 1921. It is found in Namibia and Zimbabwe.

The wingspan is about 12 mm. The forewings are light grey tinged with whitish and with a faint round cloudy somewhat darker spot in the disc at three-fourths. The hindwings are rather dark grey.

References

distactica
Moths described in 1921